Styloceras laurifolium is a species of tree in the family Buxaceae. It is found in South America.

References

laurifolium
Trees of Colombia
Trees of Peru
Trees of Ecuador